Tigre de Sibérie is a steel roller coaster at Le Pal that opened in 1990. It was Reverchon's first installed coaster.

References